Ramaniraka (born 1842), nephew of the historian and author Raombana, was a Malagasy statesman and minister. He was appointed Principal Secretary of State for Foreign Affairs from 1862 to 1863, and Minister of the Trade in 1862. He was part of the Special Embassy to the United Kingdom, France, Germany and the United States of America in 1882–1883.

Ramaniraka was born to an Andriana family from Antananarivo. His father, Rahaniraka, and his uncle, Raombana, were historians and authors educated in England.

History of Madagascar
1842 births
Year of death missing